German submarine U-590 was a Type VIIC U-boat of Nazi Germany's Kriegsmarine during World War II.

The boat was sunk by depth charges from a US aircraft on 9 July 1943.

Design
German Type VIIC submarines were preceded by the shorter Type VIIB submarines. U-590 had a displacement of  when at the surface and  while submerged. She had two shafts and two  propellers.

U-590 was fitted with five  torpedo tubes (four fitted at the bow and one at the stern), fourteen torpedoes, one  SK C/35 naval gun, 220 rounds, and a  C/30 anti-aircraft gun. The boat had a complement of between forty-four and sixty.

Service history
The submarine was laid down on 31 October 1940 at Blohm & Voss, Hamburg as yard number 566, launched on 6 August 1941 and commissioned on 2 October under the command of Heinrich Müller-Edzards.

She served with the 6th U-boat Flotilla from 2 October 1941 for training and stayed with that organization for operations from 1 April 1942 until her loss.

First and second patrols
U-590s first patrol was from Kiel on 4 April 1942. She headed for the Atlantic Ocean via the gap separating the Faroe and Shetland Islands. The boat arrived in St. Nazaire (from where she would be based for the rest of her career), in occupied France on the 17th.

Her second sortie was to mid-Atlantic but was relatively uneventful.

Third patrol
U-590 left St. Nazaire on 11 August 1942 for what was, at 106 days, her longest patrol. By the 28th she had still not left the Bay of Biscay. The boat headed west on 1 September. She steamed south, so that on 14 September she was off Western Sahara. She reached the most southerly point of the patrol (off Sierra Leone and Liberia), on 9 October. The return journey saw her southeast of the Cape Verde Islands on 1 November. She returned to St. Nazaire without any success on 24 November.

Fourth patrol
The boat had left St. Nazaire on 31 January 1943, but it was not until 11 March that she encountered and damaged the Jamaica Producer. Although believed sunk, the ship managed to reach port; she was repaired and returned to service in May 1943. This ship survived the war.

Eleven days later (21 March), a crew member broke an arm in mid-Atlantic.

Fifth patrol and loss
The submarine sank the Pelotaslóide near the mouth of the Amazon in Brazil on 4 July 1943. The ship had been waiting for tugs before entering Salinas.

U-590 was sunk by depth charges, in position , dropped from a US PBY Catalina amphibian from VP-94 on 9 July 1943 near the Amazon Estuary. Forty-five men died with U-590; there were no survivors.

Wolfpacks
U-590 took part in six wolfpacks, namely:
 Hecht (8 May – 18 June 1942) 
 Blücher (14 – 20 August 1942) 
 Iltis (6 – 23 September 1942) 
 Neuland (8 – 13 March 1943) 
 Dränger (14 – 20 March 1943) 
 Seewolf (21 – 30 March 1943)

Summary of raiding history

References

Bibliography

External links

German Type VIIC submarines
U-boats commissioned in 1941
U-boats sunk in 1943
U-boats sunk by US aircraft
U-boats sunk by depth charges
1941 ships
Ships built in Hamburg
Ships lost with all hands
World War II shipwrecks in the Atlantic Ocean
World War II submarines of Germany
Maritime incidents in July 1943